Shadrukha is a rural locality (a selo) and the administrative center of Shadrukhinsky Selsoviet of Uglovsky District, Altai Krai, Russia. The population was 525 in 2016. It was founded in 1882. There are 6 streets.

Geography 
Shadrukha is located 32 km southwest of Uglovskoye (the district's administrative centre) by road. Lyapunovo is the nearest rural locality.

References 

Rural localities in Uglovsky District, Altai Krai